Fabio Catacchini (born 19 January 1984) is an Italian footballer who plays for Tiferno 1919.

Biography

Early career
Born in Città di Castello, Umbria, Catacchini started his career with Emilia–Romagna side Parma, at first as a forward. In 2002, he left for Tuscany side Sansepolcro, where he played 2 Serie D seasons.

Pistoiese
In mid–2004, he left for Serie C1 side Pistoiese. In although not a regular of the team, he scored 2 goals in 6 league matches (as a winger) and was selected to Italy U21 B team specially for 2005 Mediterranean Games, and for a preparation match against Serie D Best XI. He played the 2 group stage matches Morocco and Libya, both as substitutes for Domenico Citro. He then transformed to play in defender role.

Rimini
In July 2007 he was signed by Serie B side Rimini. In the first season with the Emilia–Romagna side, he only made 8 start in 21 league appearances. That season Rimini finished as the 7th. In the next season, Rimini made a backward on goalscoring, which the team slipped to relegation zone and lost to Ancona in relegation playout. He played 27 starts that season. Catacchini remained with Rimini in 2009–10 Lega Pro Prima Divisione, played as a regular to reach the promotion playoffs, but lost to Verona in the first round/semi–final.  After the season (formally on 16 July) Rimini was expelled from professional league due to its financial record, the club went bankrupt and all players were released.

Frosinone
On 13 July 2010, he had a medical tests with Serie B side Frosinone and then signed a contract. On 7 August 2010, he played his first official match with team, which Frosinone won the opening match of the season (and the first Cup match of the team). The team won Seconda Divisione newcomer Trapani 3–1.

Catanzaro and Forlì 
In January 2013 he moved to Catanzaro; summer 2014 signing for Forlì.

Sansepolcro and Prato 
He remained free transfer in January 2016 for the signature Sansepolcro in Serie D; only a month later back in the Lega Pro by moving to Prato.

Tiferno 1919
In June 2019, Catacchini joined Tiferno 1919.

References

External links
 La Gazzetta dello Sport Profile (2007–08 season) 
 La Gazzetta dello Sport Profile (2008–09 season) 
 
 Football.it Profile 
 

1984 births
Living people
People from Città di Castello
Italian footballers
Serie B players
Parma Calcio 1913 players
U.S. Pistoiese 1921 players
Rimini F.C. 1912 players
Frosinone Calcio players
U.S. Catanzaro 1929 players
Association football fullbacks
Footballers from Umbria
Competitors at the 2005 Mediterranean Games
Mediterranean Games competitors for Italy
Sportspeople from the Province of Perugia